Multangular can refer to one of two bones: 
 The Trapezoid (lesser multangular)
 The Trapezium (greater multangular)

See also
 The Multangular Tower, a Roman tower in York